A list of windmills in Gironde, France.

External links
French windmills website

Windmills in France
Gironde
Buildings and structures in Gironde